Freddie Martino (born September 7, 1991) is a former American football wide receiver. He played college football at North Greenville University and attended North High School in North, South Carolina. He has been a member of the Atlanta Falcons, Philadelphia Eagles, Tampa Bay Buccaneers, Arizona Hotshots, Tampa Bay Vipers, and Dallas Renegades.

College career
Martino played for the North Greenville Crusaders from 2010 to 2013. He recorded 296 receptions for 3,766 yards and 26 touchdowns while scoring 5 rushing touchdowns in 48 career games. He was also named the Conference Carolinas Track Athlete of the Year for the 2013 indoor season. His track coach was Michael Bayne.

Professional career

Atlanta Falcons
Martino was signed by the Atlanta Falcons on May 13, 2014 after going undrafted in the 2014 NFL Draft. He was released by the Falcons on August 29, 2014 and signed to the team's practice squad on September 1, 2014. He made his NFL debut on October 19, 2014 against the Baltimore Ravens. Martino was released by the Falcons on November 21, 2014. He was re-signed to the Falcons' practice squad on November 25, 2014. He was released by the Falcons on August 7, 2015.

Philadelphia Eagles
Martino signed with the Philadelphia Eagles on August 10, 2015. He was released by the Eagles on September 5 and signed to the team's practice squad on September 6, 2015. He was released by the team on May 2, 2016.

Tampa Bay Buccaneers
Martino was signed by the Tampa Bay Buccaneers on May 11, 2016. On September 3, 2016, he was released by the Buccaneers as part of final roster cuts. The next day, he was signed to the Buccaneers' practice squad. On September 21, 2016, he was promoted to the active roster. He was released on October 3, 2016. He was re-signed to the practice squad on October 17, 2016. He was promoted back to the active roster on October 22, 2016. He caught his first touchdown pass against the Chicago Bears on November 13, 2016.

On February 27, 2017, Martino signed a one-year contract tender with the Buccaneers. He was waived on September 2, 2017, and was signed to the Buccaneers' practice squad the next day. He was promoted to the active roster on November 8, 2017. He was waived on November 13, 2017 and was re-signed to the practice squad. He was promoted back to the active roster on November 17, 2017.

On September 27, 2018, Martino was released by the Buccaneers. He was re-signed on October 13, 2018, but was released three days later.

Arizona Hotshots
Before the 2019 season, Martino joined the Orlando Apollos of the Alliance of American Football. On January 14, 2019, he was traded to the Arizona Hotshots in exchange for Donald Hawkins. The league ceased operations in April 2019.

Tampa Bay Vipers
In October 2019, Martino was selected by the Tampa Bay Vipers in open phase of the 2020 XFL Draft.

Dallas Renegades
Martino was traded to the Dallas Renegades in exchange for wide receiver Stacy Coley on January 12, 2020. Martino was placed on injured reserve on March 9, 2020. He had his contract terminated when the league suspended operations on April 10, 2020.

References

Living people
1991 births
Players of American football from South Carolina
People from North, South Carolina
African-American players of American football
American football wide receivers
North Greenville Crusaders football players
Atlanta Falcons players
Philadelphia Eagles players
Tampa Bay Buccaneers players
Arizona Hotshots players
Tampa Bay Vipers players
Dallas Renegades players
21st-century African-American sportspeople